Girolamo dai Libri (1474/1475 – July 2, 1555) was an Italian illuminator of manuscripts and painter of altarpieces, working in an early-Renaissance style. 

He was born and mainly active in Verona. His father was Francesco dai Libri, and was so named because he was an illuminator of books. Girolamo's works were noted by Giorgio Vasari. Girolamo was a pupil of Domenico Morone.  Dai Libri painted his first altarpiece, a Deposition from the Cross for Santa Maria in Organo in Verona, at the age of sixteen.

References

  Page at Artnet
 
 Berenson, B. North Italian Painters of the Renaissance. (GP. Putnam's Sons, 1907), p. 240.

1470s births
1555 deaths
15th-century Italian painters
Italian male painters
16th-century Italian painters
Artists from Verona
Italian Renaissance painters
Manuscript illuminators